"Te Extraño, Te Olvido, Te Amo" is a song recorded by Puerto Rican singer Ricky Martin for his third studio album, A Medio Vivir (1995). The song was written by Carlos Lara, while the production was handled by K.C. Porter. It was released to radio stations and on CD by Columbia Records as the lead single from the album on September 5, 1995. A Spanish language soft ballad, it is about the singer's dream woman who has left him and as he struggles to forget her, he becomes depressed. It received widely positive reviews from music critics, who ranked it among Martin's best ballads.

"Te Extraño, Te Olvido, Te Amo" was commercially successful, reaching the top 10 in France and Belgium, as well as Billboards Hot Latin Tracks chart in the United States. The first accompanying music video, aired in 1995, was directed by Gustavo Garzón and filmed in Los Angeles, California. It won the award for Video of the Year at the 1996 Premio Lo Nuestro. The second video, aired in 1997, was directed by Christophe Gstalder and filmed in France; it depicts Martin chasing after a woman and watching her from the window with binoculars. The track was included on the set lists for Martin's the A Medio Vivir Tour, the One World Tour, and the Movimiento Tour.

Several artists have covered "Te Extraño, Te Olvido, Te Amo", including Los Socios Del Ritmo and Chiquis Rivera. Their version in the style of cumbia was released for digital download and streaming by Universal Music Mexico on February 14, 2020, as the second single from the band's album, La Cumbia Es Lo De Hoy (2021). The song was nominated for Regional Mexican – Cumbia Song of the Year at the 33rd Annual Premio Lo Nuestro and entered Billboards Mexico Popular Airplay chart.

Background and composition

"Te Extraño, Te Olvido, Te Amo" was written by Carlos Lara for Ricky Martin's third studio album, A Medio Vivir (1995). Lara describes it as "an emotional conundrum with affirmations emanating from feeling and almost profiled towards passion". Musically, the song is a Spanish language soft ballad, produced by K.C. Porter. It runs for a total of 4 minutes and 39 seconds. Lyrically, "Te Extraño, Te Olvido, Te Amo" which translates to "I Miss You, I Forget You, I Love You" in English, is a romantic song about the singer's dream woman who has left him and as he struggles to forget her, he becomes depressed. The lyrics include: "Te extraño porque vive en mi tu recuerdo te olvido / A cada minuto lo intento te amo es que ya no tengo remedio / Te extraño, te olvido y te amo de nuevo" (I miss you because your memory lives in me I forget you / Every minute I try I love you is that I have no choice / I miss you, I forget you and I love you again).

Release
Columbia Records released "Te Extraño, Te Olvido, Te Amo" to radio stations and on CD on September 5, 1995, as the lead single from A Medio Vivir in the United States and Latin America. Following the success of Martin's next single, "María" in European countries, "Te Extraño, Te Olvido, Te Amo" was released as a CD single in Europe on September 9, 1997. The European standard single includes "Te Extraño, Te Olvido, Te Amo" and two remixes of "Bombón de Azúcar". The French edition contains "Te Extraño, Te Olvido, Te Amo" and "Somos la Semilla", while the German edition includes both album version and radio edit of "Te Extraño, Te Olvido, Te Amo" as well as three versions of "Dónde Estarás". "Te Extraño, Te Olvido, Te Amo" was included as the fourth track on A Medio Vivir, released September 12, 1995. The song was also later added to Martin's compilation albums La Historia (2001), 17 (2008),  Greatest Hits: Souvenir Edition (2013), Personalidad (2015), and Esencial (2018).

Critical reception
"Te Extraño, Te Olvido, Te Amo" has been met with widely positive reviews from music critics. Natalia Pignato and Umatilla High of the Orlando Sentinel labeled the song "a soft but strong ballad". In 2015, Univision staff ranked the track as Martin's fourth-best ballad, while Claudia González Alvarado from Chilango ranked it as his third-best ballad in 2021, calling it a "jewel". An author of ¡Hola! named the song a "megahit". Happyfm staff listed the track among the singer's greatest hits, stating that he is "capable of tearing the soul" and the song is "absolutely magical, from start to finish". MTV Argentina also ranked it as one of Martin's best songs in 2020.

Accolades
In her review for Cadena Dial in 2020, Nuria Serena listed "Te Extraño, Te Olvido, Te Amo" among "a handful of good songs that speak of love to make this Valentine's Day very special for you". The track was recognized as one of the best-performing songs of the year on the Pop/Ballad field at the 1996 American Society of Composers, Authors and Publishers (ASCAP) Latin Awards.

Commercial performance
"Te Extraño, Te Olvido, Te Amo" is one of Martin's most commercially successful songs in his career. In the United States, the song debuted at number 13 on Billboards Hot Latin Tracks chart on September 23, 1995, becoming Martin's eighth entry on the chart. It subsequently peaked at number nine on the chart issue dated October 21, 1995, giving Martin his fourth top 10 hit. The song also reached numbers two and nine on the US Latin Pop Songs and Tropical/Salsa charts, respectively. Besides the United States, the single topped the ballads chart in Mexico. In Europe, along with "María", "Te Extraño, Te Olvido, Te Amo" was one of Martin's first successful hits and made him popular significantly in Spain. The song reached number 17 on the European Hot 100 Singles chart. In France, the track peaked at number four and was certified gold by the Syndicat National de l'Édition Phonographique (SNEP), denoting sales of over 250,000 copies in the country. It also peaked at number four on the Ultratop Wallonia chart of Belgium and was certified gold by the Belgian Entertainment Association (BEA), denoting sales of over 25,000 copies in the country. Without physical release, "Te Extraño, Te Olvido, Te Amo" was ineligible to chart in Spain, but it peaked at number two on the country's Top 40 Radio chart.

Promotion

Music videos

The first accompanying music video was directed by Argentine director Gustavo Garzón and filmed in Los Angeles, California. The visual was aired in 1995 and won the award for Video of the Year at the 8th Premio Lo Nuestro. The second video was shot in August 1997 in France and was directed by Christophe Gstalder. It depicts Martin chasing after a woman and watching her from the window with binoculars. The video was uploaded on the singer's YouTube channel on October 3, 2009. Cristal Mesa from mitú named the visual Martin's fourth-best music video on her 2018 list, calling its sentiment "so sweet".

Live performances
"Te Extraño, Te Olvido, Te Amo" was included on the set lists for Martin's the A Medio Vivir Tour, the One World Tour, and the Movimiento Tour. He also performed the track along with his other hits during the 37th and 61st editions of the Viña del Mar International Song Festival in 1996 and 2020, respectively. He performed medleys of "Te Extraño, Te Olvido, Te Amo" and "María" at the 1996 Premios ERES and the Miss World 1997.

Cover versions and appearances in media 
"Te Extraño, Te Olvido, Te Amo" has been covered by several artists. As part of the Latin Recording Academy tribute to Martin, who was presented with the Person of the Year accolade in 2006, fellow Puerto Rican musician Luis Fonsi performed a live rendition of "Te Extraño, Te Olvido, Te Amo". Cumbia pop band Los Totora covered the song as a part of their live album, Y Ahora... Vivo (En Vivo) (2012). Florencia Álvarez performed the song on the Latin American singing competition television series Talento FOX in 2018. Mexican singer-songwriter Ximena Sariñana performed the track as an Amazon Original hit. She told Remezcla that Martin has inspired her and was an "idol" throughout her childhood and A Medio Vivir "was one of those albums that [she] could never let go of". She has "always wanted to pay tribute to it, and this was the perfect way to do it". During interviews with BELatina and Crónica, she expressed that she has "been a huge Ricky Martin fan" since early child hood and she thinks that the song is "too emblematic" of her generation, being "a theme of love". The cover version was released on February 11, 2022. Holly Alvarado of Remezcla described the song as "dynamic" and stated: "With grand strings accompanying the melody, Sariñana's voice shifts into a harmonious gesture that feels tender and heartbreakingly honest in one breath."

Los Socios Del Ritmo and Chiquis Rivera version

"Te Extraño, Te Olvido, Te Amo" was covered by Mexican band Los Socios Del Ritmo and American singer Chiquis Rivera for the band's album, La Cumbia Es Lo De Hoy (2021). The song was released for digital download and streaming by Universal Music Mexico on February 14, 2020, as the second single from the album. A cumbia song, it was produced by Javier Calderón. During an interview with El Siglo de Torreón, Mauricio González of Los Socios Del Ritmo explained: "We are working on our album with new versions of emblematic songs that have marked generations and that had not been made in cumbia." Therefore, the band picked "Te Extraño, Te Olvido, Te Amo", as the song that "made Ricky Martin famous" to cover in their own style. González also told the newspaper about collaborating with Rivera: "She is a very mediatic girl, current, current, and even when people place her more by the scandals, she is a great person, especially with great talent, which is why we are happy with the result of the new product."

An accompanying music video, released simultaneously with the song is available on the band's YouTube channel and Facebook Watch. The track was nominated for Regional Mexican – Cumbia Song of the Year at the 33rd Annual Premio Lo Nuestro, but lost to "Tú y Yo" by Raymix and Paulina Rubio. "Te Extraño, Te Olvido, Te Amo" debuted and peaked at number 27 on Billboards Mexico Popular Airplay on March 14, 2020, becoming Los Socios Del Ritmo's second and Rivera's fifth entry on the chart.

Track listing

Credits and personnel
Credits adapted from Tidal.

 Joaquín Salamanca associated performer, voice
 Chiquis associated performer, voice
 Javier Calderón associated performer, producer, guitar, recording arranger, recording engineer 
 Edelmiro Puc associated performer, clarinet
 Luis Antonio Ruíz associated performer, accordion, piano
 Federico Barragán associated performer, vocal bass
 Edwin de la Rosa associated performer, drums
 Mauricio Gonzalez associated performer, conga
 Carlos Lara Galvan composer, lyricist
 Alex Ponce mastering engineer, mixing engineer

Charts

Formats and track listings

Argentine promotional CD
"Te Extraño, Te Olvido, Te Amo" – 4:41
"María" – 4:23

European CD maxi-single
"Te Extraño, Te Olvido, Te Amo" – 4:41
"Bombon de Azucar" (M&N Classic Club Mix) – 6:14
"Bombon de Azucar" (The Disco Dream Dub) – 5:20

French CD
"Te Extraño, Te Olvido, Te Amo" – 4:41
"Somos La Semilla" – 3:56

German CD maxi-single
"Te Extraño, Te Olvido, Te Amo" (Radio Edit) – 3:58
"Te Extraño, Te Olvido, Te Amo" (Album Version) – 4:41
"Dónde Estarás" (Radio Edit) – 3:43
"Dónde Estarás" (Extended Remix) – 4:45
"Dónde Estarás" (PM Project Extended Remix) – 6:10

Mexican / Spanish promotional CD
"Te Extraño, Te Olvido, Te Amo" – 4:41

Credits and personnel
Credits are adapted from Tidal and the US maxi-CD single liner notes.

Studio locations
 Recorded at World Beat Recording (Calabasas, California), A&M Studios (Hollywood, California), Ocean Way Recording (Los Angeles), and Crescent Moon Studios (Miami, Florida)

Personnel

 Ricky Martin vocal, associated performer
 Carlos Lara composer, lyricist
 K.C. Porter producer, associated performer, director, drums, engineer, keyboards, piano
 Ian Blake associated performer, co-producer, drums, engineer, keyboards
 Frank Marocco accordion
 Tim Pierce acoustic guitar
 Michael Thompson acoustic guitar, guitar
 Diego De Pietri assistant engineer
 Eddie Miller assistant engineer
 Leslie Ann Jones assistant engineer
 Mike Aarvold assistant engineer, mixing engineer
 June Murakawa assistant engineer
 Sebastian Krys assistant engineer
 Chris Vela assistant engineer
 Della Miles associated performer
 Wil Wheaton associated performer
 Sue-Ann Carwell associated performer
 Stella Payton associated performer
 Philip Ingram associated performer
 Jackie Gouche Farris associated performer
 Maxi Anderson associated performer
 Mona Lisa Young associated performer
 Gustavo Laureano associated performer
 Terry Bradford associated performer
 Maxayn Lewis associated performer
 Bridgette Bryant associated performer
 Tony Warren associated performer
 Terry Steele associated performer
 Ricky Nelson associated performer
 Alex Brown associated performer
 Jessica Williams associated performer
 Anita Sherman associated performer
 Néil Stubenhaus bass
 Lee Sklar bass
 Jeremy Lubbock director
 Ralf Stemmann drums, engineer, keyboards, piano
 Dennie Fongheiser drums
 Mike Baird drums
 Vinnie Colaiuta drums
 Don Hahn engineer
 John Lengel engineer
 Michael Landau guitar
 Randy Waldman keyboards, piano
 Claude Gaudette keyboards, piano
 Robbie Buchanan keyboards, piano
 Brian Gardner mastering engineer
 Kathy Yore mixing engineer
 Benny Faccone mixing engineer, recording engineer
 Luis Conte percussion
 Sam Riney saxophone

Charts

Weekly charts

Year-end charts

Certifications

Release history

See also

 1995 in music
 French Top 100 singles of the 1990s

References

1995 singles
1995 songs
Ricky Martin songs
Spanish-language songs
1990s ballads
Pop ballads
Song recordings produced by K. C. Porter
Sony Discos singles
Columbia Records singles
Songs written by Carlos Lara (songwriter)